Chiapanec is a presumably extinct indigenous Mexican language of the Oto-Manguean language family. The 1990 census reported 17 speakers of the language in southern Chiapas out of an ethnic population of 32, but later investigations failed to find any speakers.

There are, however, a number of written sources on the language.  Vocabularies and grammars based on these materials include Aguilar Penagos (2012) and Carpio-Penagos and Álvarez-Vázquez (2014).

It is closely related to Mangue.

Notes

Bibliography
 Aguilar Penagos, Mario. (2012) "Gramática de la lengua chiapaneca." México: FONCA-CONACULTA 21.
 del Carpio-Penagos, Carlos Uriel, and Juan Ramón Álvarez-Vázquez. (2014) "Vocabulary of the Chiapaneca Language from the Late 18th Century."Revista LiminaR. Estudios Sociales y Humanísticos 12.1.

Chorotega
Extinct languages of North America
Mesoamerican languages
Languages extinct in the 2000s